The J Award of 2011 is the seventh annual J Awards, established by the Australian Broadcasting Corporation's youth-focused radio station Triple J. The announcement comes at the culmination of Ausmusic Month (November). For the fourth year, three awards were presented; Australian Album of the Year, Australian Music Video of the Year and Unearthed Artist of the Year. The winners were announced on Wednesday 30 November 2011.

Who's eligible? 
Any Australian album released independently or through a record company, or sent to Triple J in consideration for airplay, is eligible for the J Award. The 2011 nominations for Australian Album of the Year and Australian Music Video of the Year were selected from releases received by Triple J between November 2010 and October 2011. For Unearthed Artist of the Year it was open to any artist from the Unearthed (talent contest), who has had a ground breaking and impactful 12 months from November 2010 and October 2011.

Awards

Australian Album of the Year

Australian Video of the Year

Unearthed Artist of the Year

References

2011 in Australian music
2011 music awards
J Awards